Lir Abi (also Romanized as Līr Ābī; also known as Līr) is a village in Milas Rural District, in the Central District of Lordegan County, Chaharmahal and Bakhtiari Province, Iran. At the 2006 census, its population was 304, in 55 families.

References 

Populated places in Lordegan County